Pseudosphenoptera is a genus of moths in the subfamily Arctiinae.

Species
 Pseudosphenoptera almonia Gaede, 1926
 Pseudosphenoptera basalis Walker, 1854
 Pseudosphenoptera boyi Zerny, 1931
 Pseudosphenoptera chimaera Rothschild, 1911
 Pseudosphenoptera chrysorrhoea Draudt, 1931
 Pseudosphenoptera cocho Schaus, 1898
 Pseudosphenoptera nephelophora Hampson, 1914

References

Natural History Museum Lepidoptera generic names catalog

Arctiinae